Gordon Brown (born 1951) was Prime Minister of the United Kingdom from 2007 to 2010.
 Premiership of Gordon Brown, his premiership

Gordon Brown may also refer to:

Politics
Cathy Gordon Brown (born 1965), Independent candidate from Tennessee in the 2000 United States presidential election
Gord Brown (1960–2018), Canadian politician; represented the electoral district of Leeds–Grenville
Gordon Brown (Australian politician) (1885–1967), former President of the Australian Senate
Gordon J. Brown (born 1904), American politician in the state of Washington

Sport
Gordon Brown (guard) (1879–1911), captain of the 1900 Yale football team
Gordon Brown (running back) (born 1963), former American football running back
Gordon Brown (Argentine cricketer), early 20th-century cricketer
Gordon Brown (Canadian football) (1927–1987), Canadian football guard
Gordon Brown (footballer, born 1929) (died 2010), English footballer
Gordon Brown (footballer, born 1932) (died 1999), Scottish footballer
Gordon Brown (footballer, born 1933) (died 2005), English footballer
Gordon Brown (footballer, born 1965), Scottish footballer
Gordon Brown (footballer, born 1979), Scottish footballer
Gordon Brown (rugby league) (born 1930), English rugby league footballer
Gordon Brown (rugby union) (1947–2001), Scottish international lock forward
Gordon Brown (Zimbabwean cricketer) (born 1981), early 2000s cricketer

Other
Gordie Brown, actor who plays Mr Jones in the Canadian television drama Twice in a Lifetime
Gordon Brown (businessman) (1907–1982), New Zealand accountant, businessman, rugby administrator and local politician
Gordon H. Brown (born 1931), New Zealand art historian
Gordon S. Brown (1907–1996), Australian-born professor of electrical engineering at the Massachusetts Institute of Technology
Gordon Brown (sculptor) (1958–2020), German sculptor
Gordon Brown (author), Scottish crime fiction writer
Gordon Brown (television presenter), host of the TV series Collectors

See also
Gordon Browne (1858–1932), English artist and children's book illustrator
Gordon Browning (1889–1976), American politician who represented Tennessee in Congress and served as Governor of Tennessee
Gordon (disambiguation)
Brown (surname)